Year 1107 (MCVII) was a common year starting on Tuesday (link will display the full calendar) of the Julian calendar.

Events 
 By place 

 Scotland
 January 8 – King Edgar (the Valiant) dies at Edinburgh Castle after a 9-year reign. He is succeeded by his brother Alexander I (the Fierce), who is married to Sybilla of Normandy (an illegitimate daughter of King Henry I). A split of unity, between Alexander and his younger brother David I, makes David co-ruler in Lothian and Strathclyde (Southern Scotland). He does not receive the title of king, but of "Prince of the Cumbrians".

 England 
 August 11 – The Investiture Controversy is resolved, by the reconciliation of Henry I and Anselm, archbishop of Canterbury and the mass consecration of bishops by Anselm at the royal Palace of Westminster: William Giffard to Winchester, Roger to Salisbury, Reynelm to Hereford, William Warelwast to Exeter and Urban to Llandaff. Roger of Salisbury is also appointed Justiciar in this year.

 Europe 
 Spring – Duke Bolesław III (Wrymouth) along with his ally King Coloman (the Learned) of Hungary, invades Bohemia in order to aid Duke Svatopluk (the Lion) in gaining the Bohemian throne. The Polish expedition is a complete success: on May 14 Svatopluk is installed as Duke of Bohemia in Prague. King Henry V demands tribute from Svatopluk as his overlord and vassal of the Holy Roman Empire.
 Autumn – King Sigurd I (the Crusader) sails for the Holy Land with 60 ships (with some 5,000 men) on the first stage of the Norwegian Crusade to Palestine. Now 17, he is the first European king to support the Crusaders in the Levant. Sigurd leaves his older brother Eystein I to rule the kingdom in his absence – and visits England, France, Galicia and Sicily en route.
 October 9 – Bohemond I, prince of Antioch, lands with his army (some 34,000 men) in Epirus near Avlona. He plunders the countryside and marches to Dyrrhachium (modern Albania).
 November – Siege of Dyrrhachium: Bohemond I begins the siege of the Adriatic port city of Dyrrhachium held by its  doux Alexios Komnenos.
 Winter – Bolesław III undertakes a punitive expedition against his half-brother Zbigniew with the help of Kievan and Hungarian allies.
 Saracen pirates raid the Benedictine monastery of Saint Honorat, on the Lérins Islands .

 Levant 
 June – Kilij Arslan I, sultan of Sultanate of Rum, conquers Mosul (during the Battle of Mosul). But he is defeated and killed by Seljuk forces under Muhammad I Tapar supported by the Ortoqids and Fakhr al-Mulk Radwan.
 The Crusaders under Tancred, prince of Galilee, recover the Cilician cities of Tarsus, Adana and Mamistra conquered by Emperor Alexios I (Komnenos) 3-years ago (see 1104).
 Joscelin I, lord of Turbessel, is released by Ilghazi (the Artukid ruler of Mardin) for a ransom of 20,000 dinars and the promise of military aid.
 Emir Fadl ibn Rabi'ah is expelled by Toghtekin, ruler (atabeg) of Damascus in Syria (approximate date).

 Asia 
 August 9 – Emperor Horikawa dies after a 20-year reign and is succeeded by his 4-year-old son Toba as emperor of Japan.

 By topic 

 Commerce 
 Chinese authorities print paper money in three colors to thwart counterfeiting (approximate date).

 Literature 
 Emperor Hui Zong writes his Treatise on Tea, the most detailed description of the Song sophisticated style of tea ceremony.

Births 
 June 12 – Gao Zong, Chinese emperor (d. 1187)
 Anthelm of Belley, French prior and bishop (d. 1178)
 Enrico Dandolo (or Henry), doge of Venice (d.1205)
 Falaki Shirvani, Persian poet and writer (d. 1157) 
 Kenkai, Japanese Shingon Buddhist monk (d. 1155)
 Stephen Kontostephanos, Byzantine general (d. 1149)
 William III, count of Nevers and Auxerre (d. 1161)

Deaths 
 January 8 – Edgar (the Valiant), king of Scotland
 April 12 – Burchard (or Burkart), bishop of Basel 
 May 24 – Raymond of Burgundy, count of Galicia
 August 9 – Horikawa, emperor of Japan (b. 1079)
 September 26 – Maurice, bishop of London
 Changlu Zongze, Chinese Chan Buddhist monk 
 Cheng Yi, Chinese neo-confusian philosopher (b. 1033)
 Kilij Arslan I, sultan of the Sultanate of Rum (b. 1079)
 Mi Fu, Chinese painter, poet and calligrapher (b. 1051)
 Richard de Redvers, Norman warrior and nobleman
 Robert Fitzhamon, Norman warrior and nobleman
 Roger Bigod, Norman knight and nobleman

References